The Gasteig is a cultural center in Munich, opened in 1985, which hosts the Munich Philharmonic Orchestra. The Richard Strauss Conservatory, the Volkshochschule, and the municipal library are all located in the Gasteig. Most of the events of the Filmfest München, and many of the events of the Munich Biennale take place here.

The Gasteig is planned to be restored until 2027. A provisional house for many of its functions is Gasteig HP8.

Halls and seats
 Philharmonie, 2,387 seats, with a Klais Organ
 Carl-Orff-Saal, 528–598 seats
 Black Box, 120–225 seats
 Kleiner Konzertsaal (small concert hall), 191 seats

The Philharmonic Hall, opening like a great wood-panelled seashell, has an intimate atmosphere but poor acoustic qualities. The smaller hall "Kleiner Konzertsaal" offers slightly better acoustics for chamber music. The Gasteig comprises the Carl Orff Hall with a stage for drama, the Richard Strauss Conservatory, the Black Box studio theatre, the Münchner Volkshochschule (Adult Education Centre) for further education, various cafés and shops, e.g. the 'Pappnase' (cardboard nose) offering a selection of dramatic requisites, and the central branch of the Municipal Library with its extensive stock of books and periodicals.

When famed conductor Leonard Bernstein was asked on his opinion of the hall, he remarked, "Burn it."

History of the site
The estate behind the Gasteig was until its demolition in 1979 the location of the Bürgerbräukeller, stage for the 1923 Beer Hall Putsch and the 1939 Hitler assassination attempt by Georg Elser.
A showcase visible from outside of the Gasteig commemorates Elser's history.

Gallery

References

External links

 Gasteig website (in German)

Culture in Munich
Music venues in Germany
Tourist attractions in Munich